Route 63, also known as Avondale Access Road, is a short  north-south highway that connects the town of Avondale, Newfoundland and Labrador to the Trans Canada Highway.

Route description

Route 63 begins at an interchange with Route 1 (Trans Canada Highway, Exit 34). It heads northeast to pass by Eastbound International Speedway before winding its way through wooded areas for a few kilometres. The highway continues north to pass through neighbourhoods before entering downtown, where Route 63 comes to an end along the coastline at an intersection with Route 60 (Conception Bay Highway).

Major intersections

See also

List of highways numbered 63

References

063